Ask Me Another is an hour-long radio puzzle game show that was produced by WNYC and National Public Radio.  It was hosted by Canadian American comedian Ophira Eisenberg and featured as its "in-house musician" or "one-man house band"  independent rock musician Jonathan Coulton.  Episodes of the show were usually recorded at The Bell House in Brooklyn, New York, however the show did go to various states across the country and recorded one or more episodes from those locations.  The show was produced by WNYC Studios. During the COVID-19 pandemic in the United States, the show continued taping episodes from the homes of the participants, without a studio audience.

Format
The show features four to five individual games based on puzzle topics, wordplay, and trivia, interspersed by chatter from the show's hosts, as well as a segment featuring an interview and one or more games involving the celebrity guest of the week, who was originally called the "Very Important Puzzler". More recent episodes have four games played in a two-round tournament format.

Most games are played by two contestants. The rules of each game are explained to the contestants beforehand. Players will ring in (Player 1 rings in by ringing a bell once to respond, while Player 2 will ring their bell two times) with the general goal to score the most points for that game. The players will play two games and whichever player has the most points accumulated after the second game moves on to the Final Round. In the case of a tie after the second game, a final tie-breaker question is asked to settle the tie.

In the original format, the winning player proceeds with all other winners to the final game at the end of the show. This last game is a series of trivia questions with answers sharing a common theme, such as answers that include the name of a musical instrument in them. This round is played in a spelling bee style in which if one contestant does not know the answer, the next one in line may attempt to answer the same question; if one player gets the answer, all those who missed it are eliminated. This is played until either one player remains, or if they run out of questions, whoever can ring in first and correctly answer a final tie-breaking question. The prize for winning this round is typically a small bit of memorabilia provided by the week's current Very Important Puzzler, but generally of low monetary value.

Other games are played by the show's celebrity guest of the week, originally known as the Very Important Puzzler. The Puzzler typically plays for a contestant who has registered either via the show's website or through its social media pages. Any celebrity guest who wins their specific game wins either an "Ask Me Another" anagram tee-shirt or an "Ask Me Another" Rubik's Cube for him/herself and the contestant.

In its current format, the two contestants who won their games move on to play a Final Round, where they are each asked 8 questions on a common theme.  The contestants alternate answering questions.  Half way through, the scores are reviewed.  The second half of the round proceeds soccer shoot-out style, meaning after a contestant answers a question correctly or incorrectly, and as a result it is mathematically impossible for one of the contestants to win the round, the final round ends immediately (without the remaining questions even being asked), and the winner is announced.  If, at the end of the final round, the score is tied, a final tie-breaker question is asked to settle the tie.  The prize that is awarded to the winner is an "Ask Me Another" Rubik's Cube autographed by that episode's celebrity guest(s).

Types of games
Though the show's writers design many kinds of games, there are some commonly recurring types.  These include:

 Rhyming games, in which the contestants are asked to provide answers that rhyme with a catchphrase provided at the beginning of the game.  (Example: Contestants' answers must rhyme, sort of, with the 300 tagline "This is Sparta", so an answer identifying a British constitutional document from the time of King John would be "This is Magna Carta.")
 Musical games, in which the "in-house musician" sings clues, either based in the words sung or the music itself, and the contestants are asked to determine the meaning of those clues. (Example: Contestants' answers must identify an American state, so an answer identifying a song with lyrical clues about a "flat land" set to "Dust in the Wind" by the group Kansas must correctly identify the state in question as Kansas.) With most versions of this game the contestant can earn one point for answering the subject question and can earn an additional bonus point for correctly identifying the song used or the artist who originally performed it.
 "This, that or the other", a recurring "classic" game in which an item is announced and the contestants are asked to identify under which of three categories the item is properly classed. (Example: Contestants must identify whether the strange-sounding word "Quark" is a cheese, a dance move, or a character from Moby Dick. Quark is a cheese.) 
 Mashup games, in which two concepts are invoked by one clue and the contestant must correctly supply the mashed-together concepts.  (Example: A mashup game combining candy names and celebrity names could query contestants to combine the name of a nutty candy with the name of a co-host of The View.  That would be "Almond Joy Behar", a combination of Almond Joy and Joy Behar.)
 Word games, in which letters of a word provided in a clue are rearranged or altered in order to provide the answer contestants must supply. (Example: A game called "Beheading" could involve contestants taking a "sword" and cutting off its head to arrive at "word", which is "sword" without its initial "s".)
 "Very Important Puzzler" games, in which either characteristics of the show's guest star are explored or the guest star's own abilities are put to a test.  Often these games will be played not by show contestants, but rather by the guest stars themselves.
 Phone games, in which a contestant is not physically present at the show's recording facilities, but rather plays over the telephone.  Because this means it is more difficult to have such a contestant participate either against another player or in the final game at the end of the show with several players, these contestants play individually, winning a prize if they respond correctly to a sufficient number of questions. These games are no longer played in the series.

Guests
Guest stars on the show were originally referred to as "Very Important Puzzlers", and typically participate in two segments on the show. More recent episodes have dropped the moniker and simply refer to them as "Special Guests".  Past Guest stars have included:

 Uzo Aduba
 Brad Bird
 Lewis Black
 Alex Borstein
 Tituss Burgess
 Anna Chlumsky
 Sutton Foster
 Neil Gaiman
 Elizabeth Gilbert
 Lake Street Dive
 Bobby Lopez and Kristen Anderson-Lopez
 Sonia Manzano and Emilio Delgado of Sesame Street
 Ingrid Michaelson
 Danny Pudi
 Dan Savage
 Peter Segal
 Andy Serkis
 Curtis Sittenfeld
 Patrick Stewart
 Meg Wolitzer
 They Might Be Giants
 Writers of the podcast Welcome to Night Vale

The show's "anagrammed ending"
The show typically ends with host Eisenberg reading the credits identifying people who worked on the show.  Some of the names she reads are translated by the show's participating puzzle guru into anagrams.  Typically the puzzle guru announces at the beginning "Hey, my name anagrams to..." and then announces the anagram.  As Eisenberg lists others that worked on the show, the puzzle guru interjects the anagrammed forms of their names as well.  Eisenberg then signs off the show by announcing that she is "Her ripe begonias" (an anagram for her own name).  Occasionally, for comic effect, the puzzle guru will also provide an anagram for the call letters of WNYC ("CNYW").

Some examples of anagrams presented in the shows ending sequence are as follows:

Cast

Puzzle gurus

The show's games are created by a staff of puzzle designers, and one of these puzzle designers in particular, usually referred to as a "puzzle guru", typically appears on the show along with host Eisenberg and musical sidekick Coulton as a third individual who directs the flow of activity on the show.  There have been several of these since the show's creation, including:

 Cecil Baldwin
 John Chaneski (aka "Big John")
 Art Chung, the show's erstwhile Puzzle Editor
 John Flansburgh of They Might Be Giants (described as the "Puzzle Giant" on the show during which he played this role)
 Will Hines
 Greg Pliska
 Will Shortz, editor of The New York Times crossword puzzle (for a special episode in Central Park)
 Mary Tobler

In recent episodes no "Puzzle Guru" is involved in the show and Eisenberg & Coulton ask the questions in each game.

Substitute in-house musicians
On shows where Jonathan Coulton is taking a break from recording as the in-house musician, he has been replaced by:

 John Flansburgh
 Julian Velard
 Shonali Bhowmik

Wrap announcement 
On June 21, 2021, the show announced on social media that its final episode would be taped on September 25, 2021.

References

External links
Official page

American radio game shows
2007 radio programme debuts
NPR programs
Radio game shows with incorrect disambiguation